Fuscapex cabiochi is a species of sea snail, a marine gastropod mollusk in the family Eulimidae.

Description
The shell measures approximately 4 mm in length and can be located at depths of roughly 850 m below sea level.

Distribution
This species occurs in the following locations:
 European waters (ERMS scope)
 United Kingdom Exclusive Economic Zone

References

 Gofas, S.; Le Renard, J.; Bouchet, P. (2001). Mollusca. in: Costello, M.J. et al. (eds), European Register of Marine Species: a check-list of the marine species in Europe and a bibliography of guides to their identification. Patrimoines Naturels. 50: 180-213

External links
 To World Register of Marine Species
 Bouchet, P. & Warén, A. (1986). Revision of the Northeast Atlantic bathyal and abyssal Aclididae Eulimidae, Epitonidae (Mollusca, Gastropoda). Bollettino Malacologico. suppl. 2: 297-576
  Serge GOFAS, Ángel A. LUQUE, Joan Daniel OLIVER,José TEMPLADO & Alberto SERRA (2021) - The Mollusca of Galicia Bank (NE Atlantic Ocean); European Journal of Taxonomy 785: 1–114

Eulimidae
Gastropods described in 1986